The Clié PEG-TH55 is a Personal Digital Assistant (PDA) which was manufactured by Sony. The PEG-TH55 ran Palm OS (version 5) and featured a built-in camera, Wi-Fi, Bluetooth on non-US versions and an MP3/Atrac Player.

Specifications

Palm OS: 5.2.1
CPU: 123 MHz Sony Handheld Engine
Memory: 32MB
Display: 320 x 480, 16bit Colour, hardware assisted rotation and scaling
Sound: Internal audio amplifier and speaker, hardware assisted MP3 decoding
External Connectors: Sony T-series connector, headphone jack
Expansion: Memory Stick Pro
Wireless: Infrared, 802.11b, Bluetooth (on non-US versions)
Camera: 640x480 CMOS with shutter
Infrared: IRDA-compatible
Battery: Rechargeable Li-Ion
Size & Weight: 6.5 oz
Colour: Gray, Black

External links

TH55